Agelena oaklandensis is a species of spider in the family Agelenidae, which contains at least 1,350 species . It was first described by Manoranjan Barman in 1979 and is native to India.

References

oaklandensis
Spiders described in 1979
Spiders of the Indian subcontinent